The 1972 Maryland Terrapins football team represented the University of Maryland in the 1972 NCAA University Division football season. In their first season under head coach Jerry Claiborne, the Terrapins compiled a 5–5–1 record (3–2–1 in conference), finished in third place in the Atlantic Coast Conference, and outscored their opponents 243 to 217. The team's statistical leaders included Bob Avellini with 1,251 passing yards, Louis Carter with 474 rushing yards, and Don Ratliff with 515 receiving yards.

Schedule

References

Maryland
Maryland Terrapins football seasons
Maryland Terrapins football